The following is a list of political organizations and armed forces in Vietnam, since 1912:



1912–1945
 Việt Nam Quang Phục Hội (Vietnam Restoration League), 1912–39, led by Phan Bội Châu
 Vietnam People's Progressive Party (1923–?)
 Tâm Tâm Xã, 1923–25, led by Hồ Tùng Mậu (1896–1951), Lê Hồng Sơn (1899–1933), Phạm Hồng Thái
 Đảng Lập hiến Đông Dương (Constitutionalist Party – Parti Constitutionaliste Indochinois), 1923–39, led by Bùi Quang Chiêu (1872–1945), Nguyễn Phan Lon (1889–1960), Duong Van Giao (1892–1945)
 Hội Việt Nam Cách mạng Thanh niên (Vietnamese Revolutionary Youth League), 1925–29, led by Nguyễn Ái Quốc, Hồ Tùng Mậu, Lê Hồng Sơn, Lê Hồng Phong, Lê Duy Điếm (1906–30)
 Đảng Thanh niên Cao vọng (Nguyễn An Ninh Association), 1925–29, led by Nguyễn An Ninh
 Tân Việt Revolutionary Party (Vietnam Restoration, Vietnam Revolutionary Party, New Vietnam Revolutionary Party), 1925–30, led by Đào Duy Anh (1904–88) and Tôn Quang Phiệt (1900–73)
 Thanh niên Đảng, 1925, led by Trần Huy Liệu (1901–69)
 Đông Dương Lao động Đảng, in Cochinchina, 1926–29, led by Cao Triều Phát (1889–1956)
 Đảng Việt Nam Độc lập, 1927–29, left-wing, led by Nguyễn Thế Truyền (1898–1969), Tạ Thu Thâu
 New Vietnam Party (1927–?)
 Vietnamese Revolutionary Youth League (Việt Nam Thanh Niên Cách Mệnh Đồng Chí Hội) (1925–1929)
 Việt Nam Quốc Dân Đảng (Vietnam Nationalist Party), Tonkin, has Paramilitary forces (Yên Bái mutiny), 1945–49 pro-Republic of China/Nationalist Chinese forces, and Bảo Đại since 1947. Has military forces (Dân Quốc quân in Tonkin, Annam, Cochinchina, Anti-French in Cochinchina 1945), conflict with Viet Minh since 1945. Minor joined with Viet Minh anti-French
 Communist Party of Indochina, 1929–30, Notable members and led: Trịnh Đình Cửu (1906–90), Ngô Gia Tự (1908–35), Nguyễn Đức Cảnh (1908–32), Trần Văn Cung (1906–77), Đỗ Ngọc Du (1907–38),...(first communist cell in French Indochina)
 Communist Party of Annam, 1929–30, led by Châu Vǎn Liêm (1902–30), Nguyễn Thiệu (1903–89), Hồ Tùng Mậu, Lê Hồng Sơn
 Communist League of Indochina, established in 1930, Notable members: Trần Hữu Chương, Nguyễn Khoa Vǎn, Võ Nguyên Giáp, Nguyễn Chí Diểu,...
 Communist Party of Vietnam, led uprisings (armed struggle) in Nghệ An, Hà Tĩnh,...(1930–31), in Bắc Sơn District (1940), Cochinchina (1940), and 1945, founded the Democratic Republic of Vietnam. Vietnam People's Army with First Indochina War anti-France and army Bảo Đại,... (VPA in the Laos, Cambodia since 1947, support Lao Issara, Neo Lao Issara/Pathet Lao, Khmer Issarak and United Issarak Front ), Vietnam War anti-USA and South Vietnam Government (and support Neo Lao Hak Sat (Lao Patriotic Front), Khmer Rouge and Sihanouk), Cambodian–Vietnamese War (1975–89), Sino-Vietnamese War (1979–89),... led by Central Committee of the CPV.
 Trotskyist Movement (1931–46), in Cochinchina, led by Ta Thu Thau, in Tonkin led by Ho Huu Tuong (1910–80)
 Vietnam Restoration League (1931)
 Socialist Party (1936–)
 Democratic Party (1937–)
 League for the National Restoration of Vietnam (:vi:Việt Nam Phục quốc Đồng minh Hội), officially established in 1939, led by Cường Để, Nguyễn Thượng Hiền, Nguyễn Hải Thần, Ho Hoc Lam (1883?–1942), Tran Trong Khac, has military force (Việt Nam Kiến quốc Quân) returned from China with Imperial Japanese Army, attack on Lạng Sơn and Bắc Giang 1940, against French. League pro-Japanese, and joined with Cao Dai. Revived in 1947, and urged reconciliation between Ho Chi Minh and Bảo Đại, to 1951 when Cường Để died
 Đại Việt Quốc gia Xã hội Đảng (The National Socialist Party), Tonkin, 1936–46, led by Nguyễn Xuân Tiếu, Trần Trọng Kim, pro-Japanese
 Đảng Dân chủ Đông Dương (Cochinchinese Democratic Party),1937–39, led by Nguyễn Văn Thinh
 Đại Việt Dân chính Đảng (Great Annam Democratic Party), 1938–45, led by Nguyễn Tường Tam (1905–63)
 Vietnam Revolutionary Party (Đảng Nhân dân Cách mạng)/ Vietnam National Party, 1939–41, led by Trần Văn Ân (1903–2002)
 Nationalist Party of Greater Vietnam, 1939–75, led by Trương Tử Anh, pro-Japanese (to 1945), has military forces in Tonkin, Annam, Cochinchina, anti-French and Viet Minh, since 1954 anti-government of Ngô Đình Diệm in Central and South Vietnam, to 1963.
 Viet Minh (League for the Independence of Vietnam), included: The Indochinese Communist Party, The New Vietnam Party, The Vietnam Revolutionary Youth League, Vietnam Nationalist Party (a part)...Has military forces in Tonkin ("Cứu quốc quân"-1940, "Việt Nam Tuyên truyền Giải phóng quân" −1944, joined in 1945 named the Liberation Army – Giải phóng quân), Annam (The Ba Tơ Guerrilla Unit, Ba Tơ District, March 1945) and Paramilitary forces in Cochinchina (Liberation Youth,...). After August Revolution (that followed by the foundation of the Democratic Republic of Vietnam) in 1945, found "Vệ quốc quân" (National Guard – army of the Democratic Republic of Vietnam) in Tonkin, Annam. In Cochinchina, armed forces and Paramilitary forces of Viet Minh were participants Southern Resistance War along with National Guard, army Bình Xuyên (closely with Viet Minh), The Liberation Youth and Vanguard Youth (of the Viet Minh), minor armed forces of Cao Đài, Hòa Hảo, and Vietnam Nationalist Party. Liberation Army of Viet Minh in Cochinchina joined with National Guard 1946–48. National Guard was named the Vietnamese National Army (1946) and was referred to as the Vietnamese People's Army, since 1950, led by Communist Party.
 The Liberation League
 , established in 1942, included: The Vietnam Nationalist Party (Việt Nam Quốc Dân Đảng), The Vietnam Restoration League (Viet Nam Phuc Quoc Dong Minh Hoi), The Great Vietnam Nationalist Party (Dai Viet Quoc Dan Dang), The Viet Minh (to 1944), The Liberation League (Giai Phong Hoi), led by Trương Bội Công, Nguyễn Hải Thần, pro-Republic of China. Has military forces in Tonkin. League was revived in 1947, pro-Bảo Đại
 The Vietnam Patriots' Party (Việt Nam Ái quốc Đảng), in Cochinchina, pro-Japanese
 The Youth Justice Association
 The Youth Patriots
 Đại Việt Phục hưng Hội, 1942–45, led by Ngô Đình Diệm
 Đại Việt Duy Dân, in Tonkin, 1943–46, led by Lý Đông A (1921–47), has minor paramilitary forces
 Democratic Party of Vietnam, 1944–88, led by Dương Đức Hiền (1916–63), Nghiêm Xuân Yêm (1913–2001), anti-French, closely with Communist Party. Disputed with Communist Party in Cochinchina, Hải Dương (after August Revolution) a time. 
 The Great Religion of the Third Amnesty (Đại Đạo Tam Kỳ Phổ Độ). Since 1943, has pro-Japanese army. After August revolution, closely with Viet Minh a time. Group of Cao Trieu Phat anti-French, closely with Viet Minh, group of Pham Cong Tac pro-French. After 1954, army Cao Đài anti-Ngô Đình Diệm, minor joined Viet Cong
 The Hòa Hảo Buddhist Sect (Phật Giáo Hòa Hảo), led by Huynh Phu So, has army since 1945–46, anti-French, after pro-French, minor joined with Viet Minh. Since 1954, anti-Ngô Đình Diệm, minor joined Viet Cong
 Đại Việt Quốc gia Cách mệnh Ủy viên Hội, 1945
 United National Front, in Cochinchina (August 1945), included: National Independence Vietnam Party (Việt Nam Quốc gia Độc lập Đảng), Vanguard Youth, Doan the Cao Đài, Phat Giao Hòa Hảo, Intellectual Group, Federation of Functionaries, Buddhist League, The Struggle group of Trotskyist Movement, to be in disagreements with Viet Minh, exception Vanguard Youth joined with Viet Minh in the August Revolution
 National Union Front, formed in Nanking, China in February, 1947, by Vietnam Nationalist Party, Vietnamese Democratic Socialist Party and Vietnam Revolutionary League (Dong Minh Hoi) leaders,... had armed force anti-Viet Minh, pro-Bảo Đại
 Youth for National Liberation
 Vanguard Youth/Advance Guard Youth, has paramilitary forces pro-Japanese. After, Vanguard Youth joined with Viet Minh
 The Vietnam National Independence Party (Việt Nam Quốc gia Độc lập Đảng), in Cochinchina, 1945–46, Trần Văn Ân, Nguyễn Văn Sâm (?–1947), Hồ Văn Ngà, Phan Khắc Sửu, pro-Japanese

1946–1954 
 Socialist Party of Vietnam, 1946–88, led by Phan Tư Nghĩa (born 1910), Nguyen Xien (1907–97) anti-French
 League for the National Union of Vietnam (Hội Liên hiệp quốc dân Việt Nam/Liên Việt), 1946–51, led by Bùi Bằng Đoàn (1889–1955), Huỳnh Thúc Kháng, Tôn Đức Thắng, included: Viet Minh, Democratic Party of Vietnam, Socialist Party of Vietnam, Marxism Research Association, Vietnam Nationalist Party and Vietnam Revolutionary League (since August 1946, minor group in Vietnam Nationalist Party and Vietnam Revolutionary League)...
 Vietnamese Democratic Socialist Party, 1946 in Cochinchina, led by Huỳnh Phú Sổ, after anti-Viet Minh, a party of Republic of Vietnam
 Bình Xuyên, has armed forces anti-French (1945–46), after divided, minor joined Viet Minh (group Dương Văn Hà). Since 1954 group pro-Bảo Đại and France of Lê Văn Viễn anti-Ngô Đình Diệm. After, a minor group joined Viet Cong (group Võ Văn Môn).
 Monarchist Party, formed 1945, in Annam (Central Vietnam)
 Popular Movement, in Tonkin (?–1949)
 Vietnamese Nationalist Youth Alliance, in Tonkin
 Pays Montagnard du Sud-Indochinois, Fédération Thaï/Pays Taï, Territoire Autonome Nung, Territoire Autonome Muong, Territoire Autonome Tho,... has armed force in army of Bảo Đại or Union Indochinoise/Indochine française, to 1954
 Vietnam Catholic League (Việt Nam Liên đoàn Công giáo), 1945, led by Lê Hữu Từ (1896–1967), Nguyen Manh Ha, supported the Democratic Republic of Vietnam in 1945 and 1946. Ngô Đình Diệm led the League into the National Union Front. The Catholic Militias anti-Viet Minh in Tonkin, Bến Tre Province.
 Cao Đài League, led by Phạm Công Tắc, pro-Japanese, Cường Để
 Buddhist Group (Tỉnh đồ cư sĩ), overseas Chinese community in Cochinchina, pro-Bảo Đại
 Vietnam National Rally (Việt Nam quốc gia liên hiệp), 1947 – led by Lê Văn Hoạch, monarchism
 Indochinese Democratic Party, 1946–, pro-French
 Cochinchinese Democratic Party, pro-French, led by Nguyễn Văn Thinh
 Popular Front of Indochina, pro-French
 Popular Movement of Cochinchina, pro-French
 Democratic League, 1947 in Cochinchina
 Independents, 1946, led by Hoang Minh Chau (in National Assembly)
 Renaissance Party, 1953–63, South Vietnam, led by Trần Văn Hương
 Cần lao Party, 1954–63, South Vietnam, support the Ngô Đình Diệm

1955–1975
 New Greater Vietnam Party, South Vietnam, 1964–75, led by Nguyễn Ngọc Huy (1924–90)
 Đại Việt Cách mạng Đảng (Revolutionary Greater Vietnam Party), South Vietnam, 1965–75, led by Hà Thúc Ký (1920–2008)
 National Social Democratic Party, 1967–75, in South Vietnam, led by Nguyễn Văn Thiệu, Nguyễn Văn Ngân
 Việt Nam Nhân xã Cách mạng Đảng, in South Vietnam, 1967–75, led by Trương Công Cừu, since 1970 divided into several parts
 Dan Viet Progressive Party, in South Vietnam
 Đại Việt Duy dân đảng, in South Vietnam
 Đảng Công Nông Việt Nam (Peasants and Workers Party/Cần Lao Party), in South Vietnam, 1969–75, led by Trần Quốc Bửu
 National Social Democratic Front, South Vietnam, included: Democratic Party, Việt Nam Nhân xã Cách mạng Đảng, Việt Nam Dân chủ Xã hội Đảng,... pro-government bloc, 1968–75, led by Nguyễn Văn Thiệu
 Đảng Cộng Hòa Xã Hội, of Cao Đài, in South Vietnam
 Đảng Dân Xã, of Christians, in South Vietnam
 Forces for National Reconciliation (Lực Lượng Hòa Giải Hòa Hợp Dân Tộc), in South Vietnam, led by Vũ Văn Mẫu (1914–98)
 United Front for the Liberation of Oppressed Races, 1964–92, guerrilla group
 National Liberation Front for South Vietnam (NLF), 1960 – January 1977, has Liberation Army of South Vietnam, led by Workers Party of Vietnam
 Radical Socialist Party of the South Vietnam, in NLF, 1961–75, led by Nguyễn Văn Hiếu (1922–91), Nguyễn Văn Tiến
 Democratic of Party of the South Vietnam, in NLF, divided since Democratic Party of Vietnam (founded 1944) –1975, led by Trần Bửu Kiếm (born 1921), Huỳnh Tấn Phát
 People's Revolutionary Party of South Vietnam, in NLF, 1962–75 led by Central Committee of Workers Party of Vietnam, chairman: Võ Chí Công, general Secretary: Nguyễn Văn Linh, was the southern branch of the Workers Party of Vietnam
 Alliance of National, Democratic and Peace Forces of Việt Nam (Liên minh các Lực lượng Dân tộc, Dân chủ và Hòa bình Việt Nam), 1968, led by Trịnh Đình Thảo (1901–86), merged Vietnamese Fatherland Front of North Vietnam, National Liberation Front of South Vietnam 1977

1975–present
 National United Front for the Liberation of Vietnam, 1982–87, has Armed forces, Hoàng Cơ Minh, an illegal organization by the Vietnamese government.
 Front of Patriotic Forces for the Liberation of Viet Nam (Mặt trận Thống nhất các Lực lượng Yêu nước Giải phóng Việt Nam), 1980–84, Lê Quốc Túy and Mai Văn Hạnh, had armed force, an illegal organization by the Vietnamese government

See also
 List of central officeholders in the Communist Party of Vietnam
 List of Vietnamese political parties
 Military history of Vietnam

References

Political organizations and armed forces